Claggett, Clagget or Clagett is both a surname and a given name. Notable people with the name include:

Surname:
Anthony Claggett (born 1984), American baseball player
Charles Clagget (1740–c.1795), Irish composer, instrument maker and inventor
Clifton Clagett (1762–1829), American lawyer and politician
Galen R. Clagett (born 1942), American politician (Maryland)
Nicholas Clagett (1685/5–1746), English bishop
Thomas John Claggett (1743–1816), first bishop of Maryland
Virginia P. Clagett (born 1943), American politician (Maryland)
William B. Clagett (1854–1911), American farmer and politician
William H. Clagett (1838–1901), American politician and lawyer

Given name:
Claggett Wilson (1887–1952), American painter

See also
Claggett's Brewery, a 19th-century brewery in Maryland (US)
Claggett Middle School
Claggett Shale, a geographical formation in Montana (US)